Anelia is one of the most famous Bulgarian pop-folk singers. She has gained popularity with her second single - "Poglednij me v otchite", released in 2002, which became her signature song and the best selling single of 2003 in Bulgaria. In the year-end chart of 2003 in Bulgaria, the album "Poglednij me v otchite" also reached number 1. Because of the practice in Bulgaria every song, which has a video to be recognized as a single, Anelia has released 34 singles with 33 videos, 23 of which has peak a chart in Bulgaria. First five studio albums of Anelia has topped the Bulgarian Pop-folk Albums Chart. Her sales stand at 230 000 copies at Bulgaria only.

Studio albums

Video albums

Singles

As a featured artist

Music videos

Year-end charts

All-Time chart

Pop music discographies
Discographies of Bulgarian artists